Bashar Rashid ( 1 January 1949 – 18 May 1978) was an Iraqi football striker who played for Iraq in the 1974 FIFA World Cup qualification. He played for the national team in 1973.

On 15 September 1975, Bashar was imprisoned by the Ba'athist regime, sentenced to death in December 1976 and executed on 18 May, 1978 on charges of being a member of the Iraqi Communist Party.

Career statistics

International goals
Scores and results list Iraq's goal tally first.

References

External links
https://twitter.com/hassaninmubarak

1949 births
1978 deaths
Iraqi footballers
Iraq international footballers
Al-Shorta SC players
Association football forwards
Iraqi communists
20th-century executions by Iraq
Executed communists
Iraqi Communist Party politicians